The Mercenaries of Metal Tour was a 1988 concert tour by English heavy metal band Judas Priest, in support of their most recent release, Ram It Down. Unlike their other tours of the 1980s, no official Judas Priest release includes any live recordings from this tour. It was the final tour the band did with longtime drummer Dave Holland. The week before the tour started, the band visited Stockholm, Sweden for full production rehearsals at Hovet. Before the official tour start, the band played a few warm-up shows including one in a club in Amsterdam, Netherlands in early April 1988, where the footage for the Johnny B. Goode video was shot.

Setlist
The average setlist for the tour is as follows, though it varied, such as the addition of "Johnny B. Goode" at several shows in Europe, "Turbo Lover" at several shows in North America, and "Beyond the Realms of Death" at various shows. The setlist also saw the return of "Sinner", which had been a live staple since 1977, but had been dropped like all other pre-Killing Machine songs, except for "Victim of Changes", during the Fuel for Life Tour.

"The Hellion / Electric Eye"
"Metal Gods"
"Sinner"
"Breaking the Law"
"Come and Get It"
"I'm a Rocker"
"The Sentinel"
"The Ripper"
"Beyond the Realms of Death"
"Some Heads Are Gonna Roll"
"Turbo Lover" (Added on July 20, 1988)
"Ram It Down"
"Heavy Metal"
"Victim of Changes"
"The Green Manalishi (With the Two Prong Crown)"
"Johnny B. Goode" (Dropped after May 26, 1988)
"Living After Midnight"
"Hell Bent for Leather"
"You've Got Another Thing Comin'"

Tour dates
The venues and events for the tour were located in Europe and North America. They were supported by Bonfire on the European and British legs, Cinderella on the British and North American legs and Slayer on the North American leg.

Personnel
 Rob Halford – lead vocals
 Glenn Tipton – guitar
 K. K. Downing – guitar
 Ian Hill – bass
 Dave Holland – drums
 Jim Silvia – tour manager

References

1988 concert tours
Judas Priest concert tours